The discography of record producer, songwriter, singer, and rapper Rico Love consists of two studio albums and one EP, and seven singles (as a lead artist).

Albums

Studio albums

EPs

Mixtapes

Miscellaneous

Singles

As lead artist

As featured artist

Guest appearances

References

Discographies of American artists
Hip hop discographies
Rhythm and blues discographies
Pop music discographies